The peaked cap, peaked hat, service cap, barracks cover or combination cap is a form of headgear worn by the armed forces of many nations, as well as many uniformed civilian organisations such as law enforcement agencies and fire departments. It derives its name from its short visor, or peak, which was historically made of polished leather but increasingly is made of a cheaper synthetic substitute.

The term forage cap is also used though that also applies to "field service cap" or the side cap.

Other principal components are the crown, band and insignia, typically a cap badge and embroidery in proportion to rank. Piping is also often found, typically in contrast to the crown colour, which is usually white for navy, blue for air force and green for army. The band is typically a dark, contrasting colour, often black, but may be patterned or striped.

In the British Army, each regiment and corps has a different badge. In the United States Armed Forces, the cap device is uniform throughout every service branch, though different variants are used by different rank classes.

History 

The peaked cap originated in late 18th or early 19th-century Northern Europe, usually worn by working-class men. In the later years of the Napoleonic Wars, it began to appear in 1811 in the Russian army and later in the Prussian army (Russia's ally at that time), being popular because of its comfort and light weight, as opposed to the cumbersome bicorns and shakos that were standard duty issue. During the Biedermeier period (1815–48), they became universal dress for German and Austrian civilian males of all classes, and for the entire 19th century, they were popular with the working classes all over Northern Europe, although in Britain the flat cap was preferred by civilians towards the end of the century.

In 1846, the United States Army adopted the peaked cap during the Mexican–American War due to the unsuitability of the shako in the hot Mexican climate. In 1879, a form of peaked cap was adopted by chief petty officers of Britain's Royal Navy, in imitation of an undress headdress worn by officers from as early as 1825. The British Army adopted peaked caps in 1902 for both the new khaki field dress and (in coloured form) as part of the "walking out" or off-duty wear for other ranks. A dark blue version was worn with dress blues by all ranks of the U.S. Army between 1902 and 1917.

During the 20th century, the combination or peaked cap became common in the armies, navies, air forces and police forces of the world, forgone in combat by common soldiers in favour of more protective combat helmets.

During the Cold War and after dissolution of the Soviet Union, uniforms copied from the Russian pattern were issued to the armies of various Asian, Eastern European, African communist nations and post-Soviet states (except Baltic states, Azerbaijan (similar design but closely aligned with the Turkish counterparts), Georgia (after 2004) and Ukraine (after 2016)). Particularly famous are the oversized caps worn by North Korean army officers, unchanged since the 1950s.

Military usage

Australia

In the Australian Army, the peaked cap is known as the service cap and is generally worn with the "Patrol Blues" order of dress by all ranks with the cap colour being blue. A khaki service cap could be worn previously by warrant officers, commissioned officers and officer/staff cadets with any general duty order of dress and working/protective dress until September 2010.

In the Royal Australian Air Force, the peaked cap is the standard headdress for all ranks, usually worn with service dress, ceremonial dress and tropical dress among others.

In the Royal Australian Navy, the peaked cap is the standard headdress worn by personnel holding the rank of petty officer and above when wearing ceremonial dress, regular day dress and informal evening dress among others.

Austria 

Throughout the 19th century, the Austro-Hungarian Army were issued with shakos, originally in black leather and later in pike grey wool. Gradually, the height of the shako decreased and the cardboard stiffening removed until, by 1908, it had evolved into the ski cap. This was worn by Austrian officers and enlisted personnel during both World Wars, but when the postwar Austrian Bundesheer was established in 1955 an olive drab peaked cap and American style uniform were introduced.

Canada

The cap was used in the early stages of the First World War as the primary headgear, but increased head injuries led to its replacement by the Brodie helmet as primary combat head protection.

In the Canadian Forces, the peaked cap is the primary headgear for men's Royal Canadian Navy service dress. It has been abandoned in the Royal Canadian Air Force in favour of the wedge cap. It has also been eliminated from the Canadian Army in favour of the beret, with two exceptions. General officers wearing army uniform can wear either a beret or a peaked cap with service dress. Royal Canadian Infantry Corps members of foot guards units such as the Canadian Grenadier Guards wear the bearskin cap with full dress but the peaked cap with undress and service dress.

On navy caps, the peak and chinstrap of the service cap are always black. The cap band is black with the exception of navy military police, who wear a scarlet cap band, and members of Canadian Special Operations Forces Command, who wear a tan cap band.

On both navy and army caps, the chinstrap is affixed to the cap via two small buttons, one roughly over each ear; these buttons are miniature versions of the buttons on the service dress tunic, and as such bear an RCN or regimental device.

The peak of the cap of non-commissioned members and subordinate officers is left plain, and officers' caps are adorned with one or more bands of braid (depending on rank) at the forward edge of the peak. The peak of the junior officer's cap has a gold band along the forward edge, that of the senior officer has a row of gold oak leaves across the forward edge, while that of the flag officer has two rows of gold oak leaves, one along the forward edge and one near the cap band. The same oak leaves are worn by the Governor General of Canada as Commander-in-Chief of the Canadian Armed Forces.

The service cap is theoretically unisex, although there is a service hat for women which does not have a crown top and has a stiff brim all around. The front of the brim is formed into a visor and the sides and back are folded upwards.

China

Members of the People's Liberation Army also wear a peaked cap, with the design influences from the former Soviet Union. However, since from 2007, PLA started to change to adapt the Type 07 Service Uniform, the new uniform retains peaked cap but the style is more like the US and Commonwealth peaked cap instead of the Soviet style caps.

Denmark
In Denmark, the use of peaked cap has seen a gradual decline from official uniforms, but it is still used in the ceremonial uniforms the general corps of the Army, officers of the Airforce, officers of the Navy, the police and fire department.

Germany
Peaked caps were first issued to German Landwehr troops during the Napoleonic Wars known as the Wachstuchmütze and made from oil cloth, since these were cheaper and easier to maintain than the heavy leather shakos and elaborate tailcoats worn by the British, French and Russian armies. The Prussian army was also the first to adopt the frock coat, so officers would not soil their dress uniforms on campaign.

When the spiked  helmet was introduced during the 1840s, enlisted German troops were issued with peakless forage caps resembling the sailor cap. Officers, however, continued to wear the German-style peaked cap to set themselves apart from the French, who wore the kepi peaked cap. Initially, German peaked caps were in the uniform color, e.g., Prussian blue, cornflower blue, green, etc., but before the First World War a field grey hat was issued, with piping colour coded for infantry, artillery or cavalry. These caps, known as "crushers", could be worn beneath a  helmet or stuffed into a pocket or knapsack.

In 1935, the Nazis introduced new uniforms designed for modern mechanised warfare. However, the basic design including the peaked cap remained the same as in the Weimar Republic's Reichsheer. But the new national emblem featuring eagle clutching swastika, and black-red-white roundel in oak wreath were introduced on the caps. Enlisted personnel and non-commissioned officers were issued with peaked caps with leather chincord. Officers received caps with metallic chincord. Both enlisted-NCOs' caps and officers' caps had specially colored piping around the cap according to their service branch (white for infantry, pink for panzer and so on). Gestapo and SS men were issued with black  featuring a silver death's head. On campaign, Wehrmacht officers often removed the wire stiffening so the cap would resemble the older First World War–era crusher.

After the Second World War, both the West German Bundeswehr and East German National People's Army continued to be issued uniforms derived from the Second World War pattern. East German caps bore the DDR State Cockade with the Hammer and Compass design, while West German caps had a cockade in the German national colours, and a badge featuring a pair of crossed swords. After reunification, the  remained part of the German army dress uniform.

Indonesia 
Members of the armed and uniformed services in Indonesia wear the peaked cap during ceremonial and operational duties. It is widely worn by the Indonesian National Police, the Indonesian National Armed Forces and other uniformed institutions in the country.

Israel 

In the Israel Defense Forces, combination caps are used only by Israeli Air Force and Navy officers in ceremonial dress; Military Police soldiers while on duty; Israel Defense Forces Orchestra soldiers; and some regimental sergeants major of other service branches when in ceremonial dress.

Poland 
The rogatywka is a 4-cornered type of peaked cap, related to the czapka and worn by members of the Polish Land Forces.

Naval officers and air force personnel, however, wear conventional peaked caps.

Russia 

Russia was the first country to adopt the peaked cap. The official act of adopting the cap for military use was made by Alexander I of Russia in 1811. During the Napoleonic Wars, various early versions of the peaked cap were in use in the Russian army. Imperial Russia abandoned the cap for a short period in the second half of the 19th century for a forage cap similar to the one used by Americans during their civil war, but the peaked cap soon returned. Early soldiers' peaked caps were, in fact, peakless, hence the nickname  (soldier's flapjack) for the headgear; officers' caps had peaks from the start and looked like modern peaked caps. Also during the Imperial period, peaked caps were introduced as part of government officials' uniforms.

In 1914, peakless caps were abolished everywhere in Russian armed forces except the Navy, and modern peaked caps were issued to all soldiers. However, after the October Revolution of 1917, it was replaced in Red Army field uniforms by the budenovka, and later by the garrison cap. The dress uniforms, on the other hand, retained this headgear, and various paramilitary Soviet agencies like the NKVD or VOKhR kept using it in all uniforms. Agencies like railway workers, firemen, pilots, mining supervisors, foresters, customs officers in the Soviet Union also were organised along military lines and wore uniforms with peaked caps of various designs.

In 1990s, the Russian peaked cap was redesigned and widely issued to the armed forces and police. Caps of this shape are most associated with Russia among foreigners, since they are large and high.  In 2012, after army general Sergey Shoygu was appointed Minister of Defence, the design of the peaked cap was changed again to a lower and more proportional style.

United Kingdom

Royal Navy 

Royal Navy officers were first issued peaked caps in 1825 as a less formal alternative to the bicorne hat. From 1846, it was worn with a crown on the front, and later (from 1856), gold braid was added to the brim to ensure commissioned officers were instantly recognised by their subordinates. Commanders, captains and commodores had one row of braid on their peaks, whereas flag officers had two. Before the Second World War, naval officers were required to possess two caps: one with a white cover for summer and one without for winter. However, flag officers often preferred the white-topped cap in order to stand out from their subordinates. 

Male Royal Navy officers, warrant officers, chief petty officers and petty officers today wear a framed cap with a white cover and a black band in nos 1, 2 and 3 dress; originally worn only in tropical climates, the white cover was adopted for all areas after the Second World War. Officers have the option of a cotton or plastic cover. Female personnel wear a tricorne hat instead.

Royal Marines 

All Royal Marines personnel wear a cap with a white cover and a red band with 'blues' uniform. The Royal Marines Band Service also wear this cap with the Lovat uniform and the 'Half Lovats' equivalent of army barrack dress. Women wear caps of a slightly different pattern.

British Army 
British Army officers wore blue peaked caps as early as the Crimean War to distinguish themselves from enlisted men who wore the pillbox hat. The peaked caps were widely worn on campaign during the First and Second World Wars, until the more practical beret was popularised by generals like Sir Bernard Montgomery. After the war, officers continued to wear khaki caps as part of the number 2 dress uniform, but by the 1990s these had been phased out in favour of the dark blue and red caps previously worn with the number 1 dress uniform.

Peaked caps were first issued to enlisted men in 1908 to replace the Glengarry caps and pillbox hats of the Boer War era. The new caps were made of khaki wool and sometimes had a neck flap to protect against the cold. Nicknamed the "gor blimey", these caps are associated with the First World War 'Tommy Atkins' and continued to be issued to members of the Household Cavalry, Foot Guards, Home Guard and Territorial Army during the Second World War.

All personnel of most regiments and corps of the British Army wear a forage cap, as the peaked cap is formally called, in numbers 1 and 2 dress, the exceptions being:

 The Royal Tank Regiment, Royal Regiment of Fusiliers, Army Air Corps, Parachute Regiment, Special Air Service, Intelligence Corps and 4/73 (Sphinx) Special Observation Post Battery RA, who wear berets;
 The Royal Regiment of Scotland, who wear a regimental Glengarry with cockfeathers taken from the former ceremonial uniform of the Royal Scots;
 The Royal Irish Regiment, who wear the caubeen;
 The Brigade of Gurkhas, who wear a round Kilmarnock cap in no 1 dress and the slouch hat in no 2 dress
 The Queen's Royal Hussars, whose officers wear a tent hat in no 2 dress.

It has a cap band which may be coloured (red for all royal regiments and corps), a crown (formerly khaki, now dark blue, except for the Royal Military Police, who have always worn red, and the Rifles, who wear rifle green), which may have coloured piping or a regimental/corps colour, and a patent leather peak and chinstrap. The chinstrap is usually secured above and across the peak and secured at each end by a small (20 line) button of the appropriate regimental or corps pattern.

Officers in some regiments are also required to wear a khaki version of the cap, often called the "service dress cap", with service dress (the officers' no 2 dress) or barrack dress; the design of this dates back to the cap worn in the field until replaced by the steel helmet during the First World War.

Female personnel wear a peaked cap of a different pattern. For uniformity, however, female musicians wear the same peaked cap as male personnel in formal dress. Members of the Auxiliary Territorial Service wore a soft peaked cap of a different pattern again.

Royal Air Force 

All male personnel of the Royal Air Force wear a cap with a blue-grey crown and a black band, worn with the appropriate badge, in no 1 dress, and sometimes in other uniforms as well. The peak is:

 Black and polished for airmen, non-commissioned officers (NCOs) and warrant officers
 Blue-grey fabric for officers of the rank of wing commander and below
 Black and polished with one row of gold oak leaves for officers of the rank of group captain
 Black and polished with two rows of gold oak leaves for officers of the rank of air commodore and above

The caps of other ranks of the RAF Police have a white crown. Officer cadets wear the officers' cap with a white band instead of a black band.

Female officers and warrant officers wear a peaked cap of a different pattern. Female other ranks wear a round hat instead, although the female version of the peaked cap was formerly worn by all female ranks of the RAF Police. For uniformity, however, female musicians wear the same peaked cap as male personnel in formal dress. All ranks of the Women's Auxiliary Air Force wore a peaked cap of a different pattern again, similar to that of the Auxiliary Territorial Service.

United States

United States Air Force

In the United States Air Force, all personnel have the option to wear service caps, but only field-grade (major through colonel) and general officers are required to own one. The service cap is issued without charge to enlisted airmen assigned to certain ceremonial units and details.

Air Force service caps are Air Force blue (shade 1620), matching the coat and trousers of the service dress uniform, with a gloss black visor and black chinstrap secured by silver-colored buttons bearing a version of the "Hap Arnold emblem" first designed by James T. Rawls for use by the Air Force's predecessor, the Army Air Forces, in 1942. The cap badge consists of a relief of the Great Seal of the United States rendered in silver-colored metal. For enlisted members, the arms are surrounded by a silver-colored metal circle. Commissioned officers' insignia is larger and lacks the encompassing circle. The Air Force Band and Air Force Base Honor Guard each have their own distinctive cap insignia and other uniform devices. Field-grade officers' visors have two pairs of clouds and lightning bolts, patterned after the oak leaf motifs used by the other services. General officers' caps add an extra pair of clouds and bolts on the visor, while the cap of the Chief of Staff of the United States Air Force adds clouds and bolts around the entire cap band. The clouds and bolts are jokingly referred to in military slang as "farts and darts", much as the other services' oak leaf motifs are known as "scrambled eggs".

The USAF service cap is also worn by the Air Force's civilian auxiliary, the Civil Air Patrol (CAP). Senior members (those over the age of 18 who are not cadets and everyone over 21) may wear the service cap with a CAP-specific badge.

United States Army

In the United States Army, service caps are optional for wear with the green service uniform. They consist of a dark olive drab top and hat band matching the uniform coat with a russet brown leather visor and chinstrap. The combination cap for the blue service is midnight blue matching the uniform coat with a gloss black visor. The enlisted cap has a golden stripe on top of the cap band and a black chinstrap. The version for officers has a cap band with the branch-of-service color between two golden stripes, and a gold-colored chinstrap. Field-grade officers have oak leaves, known unofficially as "scrambled eggs", on the visor. General officers' caps are similar to those of field-grade officers, but the cap band is dark blue and embroidered with gold oak leaf motifs. For both the green and blue caps, enlisted soldiers wear a cap badge of a circular disk embossed with the United States' coat of arms, while officers wear a larger badge of the coat of arms without any backing.

United States Coast Guard

The United States Coast Guard wears the combination cap, known as the combo cover, with the Service Dress Blue uniform (SDBs), the Tropical Blue uniform (Trops), and with all other formal dress uniforms. The cover is identical to that of the Navy with respect to the chinstrap and peak ornamentation. Its crown is white. The buttons securing the chin strap to the sides of the band are smaller versions of the buttons worn on the Coast Guard's uniform coats. The blue band around the cap includes blue fabric extending upward on the front of the crown to serve as a backing behind the device. In the case of enlisted personnel, this extension is a blue circle identical to that on the caps of naval officers and chief petty officers. In the case of commissioned officers, however, the extension is a more elaborate polygon to accommodate the officers' cap device.

Unlike their naval counterparts, coast guardsmen below the rank of chief petty officer wear combination covers; their cap device is a golden representation of the Coast Guard emblem. Coast Guard chief petty officers' cap devices match those of the Navy, albeit with a shield on the front of the fouled anchor; like Navy chiefs, their cap devices are enlarged renderings of the rank insignia worn on their collars. Coast Guard officers' cap device is an eagle with wings outstretched, above an anchor grasped horizontally in its talons.

United States Marine Corps
In the United States Marine Corps, these caps, bearing a cap badge of the Corps' Eagle, Globe, and Anchor (EGA) device, are worn in two forms. 

For blue dress uniforms, the cap is white with a gloss black visor. The enlisted version features a black chin strap and is worn with an all-gold EGA device, while the officer version features a gold and scarlet chinstrap and a gold and silver EGA device. In addition, officers wear a lace cross on the top, called the quatrefoil, a traditional mark of distinction enabling sharpshooters aboard ships to identify friendly officers from foes. 

For the green service uniforms, an olive drab combination cap is available; the EGA device and the chin strap are black for all ranks. In both cases, field grade officers (majors, lieutenant colonels and colonels) have gold oak leaf motifs on the visor, similar to those worn by navy commanders and captains, while general officers' caps have a different, larger oak leaf motif on the visor. Additionally the blue dress cap of the Commandant of the Marine Corps (as well as the Chairman of the Joint Chiefs of Staff if it is also a Marine) adds an additional gold oak leaf motif to the front of the band. In the Marine Corps, the combination cap is commonly referred to as the "barracks cover", and the particular versions are referred as the dress cap or service cap in Marine Corps Orders.

United States Navy
In the United States Navy, midshipmen, chief petty officers, and commissioned officers wear combination covers, but there are differences between the three types. In general, the cap has a rigid framed crown with a cloth cover, a black hatband that extends to a semicircle on the grant to support a badge device, a glossy black visor, and a chinstrap secured by two gold colored buttons that match the buttons of the wearer's service dress uniform. 

Midshipmen at the United States Naval Academy, United States Merchant Marine Academy or in Naval Reserve Officers Training Corps units wear a gold fouled anchor device and have a gold chinstrap. Chief petty officers wear a cap badge consisting of a gold fouled anchor with silver block letters "USN" superimposed on the shank of the anchor, with the addition of one, two, or three stars at the top of the anchor if the wearer is a senior chief petty officer, a master chief petty officer, or the Master Chief Petty Officer of the Navy, respectively, and have a black chinstrap. Commissioned officers wear an officer's crest badge consisting of a silver federal shield over two crossed gold fouled anchors surmounted by a silver eagle and have a gold chinstrap. Additionally, officers of rank commander and captain have gold embroidered oak leaves and acorns on a black felt-covered visor, referred to as "scrambled eggs", with additional embroidery for flag officers. 

The covering fabric is khaki for use with the service khaki uniform or in white for use with blue and white uniforms (the use of blue fabric for use with blue uniforms was discontinued in 1963). Since October 2018 the same cap style is used by both males and females.

Civilian usage 

Public safety officers, such as those from the police, fire department, ambulance service, and customs, often wear peaked caps, especially on formal occasions. In the US, police forces use caps that have softer tops and are not round and rigid in form (notable are those worn in New York and San Francisco). British and Australian policemen have a checkerboard pattern on the cap band, and traffic wardens often have a reflective yellow strip.

A number of civilian professions—the most notable modern examples being merchant marine and civil aviation—also wear peaked caps. In such civilian old traditional usage, only captains aboard ships and pilots in command (airline captains) in service aboard aircraft, have the golden oak leaf motifs ("scrambled eggs") on the visor; this is in contrast to the naval tradition, where it is also worn by commanders (one rank below captain) as well as by commodores and flag officers.

The original civilian variant of the peaked cap was widely worn by sailors and workers from the mid 19th century onwards. These were made of wool or canvas, and sometimes waterproofed with tar. During the 1960s, blue denim Greek fisherman's caps became an essential accessory for the counterculture due to their use by John Lennon of the Beatles. A black leather version, sometimes embellished with chains or metal studs, was worn by bikers, greasers imitating Marlon Brando in The Wild One, and members of the 1970s Black Power movement.

Peaked caps are also commonly worn around the world by some railway, or airport staff (baggage porters, but often wearing kepi type cap), bus drivers and security guards. A peaked cap is a part of the Salvation Army uniform in most of the territories it operates in.

Student caps in Northern and Central European countries are frequently peaked caps. The student caps in Nordic countries are traditionally white (summer uniform) or black (winter uniform) but the colors of the bands, lining, tassels and cockades differ, depending on the school or the faculty. In German-speaking countries and in Poland, Estonia and Latvia, student caps come in a variety of colors, depending on the colors of the student organization or the school, and can be decorated with its zirkel (a monogram).

Canada
The Canadian Coast Guard shares a similar cap and colours with the Royal Canadian Navy.

Police forces across Canada also wear a peaked cap. The cap is basic black with colour cap band of either of red (municipal forces), blue (Ontario Provincial Police, OPP) or yellow (Royal Canadian Mounted Police, RCMP).

Until recently the OPP's front line officers wore a black campaign hat, but has since reverted to the peaked cap. The RCMP only use the campaign hat for formal dress uniform or by members of the Musical Ride. Use of service cap by female officers are all but gone and replaced by peaked cap as unisex headwear. The only other headwear available is the turban for male Sikh police officers.

Hong Kong and Macau 

The peaked cap and peaked hat are worn as formal dress by members of the Hong Kong Disciplined Services (police, fire, customs/excise, immigration, etc.) with influence from the British colonial services. All caps use black as base colour. The crown is flat and round in shape. Female police officers' caps have a coloured band, no crown top and front of the brim is flat with sides/back folded upwards. Only members of the Hong Kong Police's Tactical units, Emergency unit, and motorcycle officers do not wear the peaked cap when on duty.

Members of the Hong Kong Sea Cadet Corps, Hong Kong Adventure Corps and Hong Kong Air Cadet Corps (including the Ceremonial Squadron) use the British-based cap.

The dress uniforms for the Public Security Police Force of Macau and the Corpo de Bombeiros de Macau utilises a peaked cap. However, most police officers in Macau wear berets or ball caps for patrol.

United Kingdom

Peaked caps are used by a number of civilian services in the United Kingdom. His Majesty's Prison Service and British ambulance services do not currently issue peaked caps to be worn on duty, although they formerly did so. However, peaked caps are still worn with formal uniform on ceremonial occasions.

Police 

Basic headgear for male police officers in the UK is a peaked cap. This includes a cap badge and generally has a black and white diced band (called Sillitoe tartan) around the hat. Caps worn by traffic police officers have white crowns or covers. 

Caps are also part of the uniforms of male police community support officers (PCSOs), who wear a plain light blue band.

Ministry of Defence Guard Service 

The Ministry of Defence Guard Service currently issues a peaked cap that is a dark shade of navy blue with a leather chin strap and MGS cap badge on the front to all of its male officers. Female officers are issued with a peaked cap of a different shape similar to that of female soldiers. Dog section officers traditionally wear a beret.

The cap badge consists of the Ministry of Defence emblem in the centre backed by silver with a navy blue border encircling the emblem that contains text that reads 'Ministry of Defence Guard Service', all below a crown.

Fire services 
Members of British fire services wear standard peaked caps. Female members wear identical caps to male members. Before the Second World War, some British fire brigades, including the London Fire Brigade, wore the peakless Brodrick cap, which had formerly been worn by the British Army. However, when all fire brigades were amalgamated into the National Fire Service in 1941 it adopted the peaked cap, and this was retained when it was disbanded in 1948 and separate fire brigades were again formed by each local authority.

United States

Public Health Service Commissioned Corps and NOAA Commissioned Corps

The United States Public Health Service Commissioned Corps and the National Oceanic and Atmospheric Administration Commissioned Corps—the two small services, consisting only of officers, which are the two uniformed services that are not armed forces—wear uniforms and rank insignia adopted from the Navy. The combination covers of the two services are identical to those of the Navy with respect to colors, and peak ornamentation. The chinstrap of the PHS is gold with a burgundy stripe. The buttons securing the chin strap to the sides of the band are smaller versions of the buttons worn on the services' uniform coats. The cap device of NOAACC officers is similar to that of Navy officers with a globe in place of the shield; the cap device of PHSCC officers is similar to that of Navy officers but has a caduceus in place of one of the anchors.

United States Maritime Service
While the majority of American merchant mariners are employed by shipping businesses and accordingly wear either uniforms prescribed by their employers or civilian attire, some officers receive commissions in the United States Maritime Service for federal government duty, such as the faculty of the United States Merchant Marine Academy and the Military Sealift Command's civilian officers manning non-commissioned United States Naval Ships. These officers wear uniforms and rank insignia adopted from the U.S. Navy, albeit with United States Merchant Marine's own button design, cap device, awards, and decorations. The combination covers these officers are identical to those of naval officer with respect to colors, chinstrap and peak ornamentation. The buttons securing the chin strap to the sides of the band are smaller versions of the buttons worn on their coats. The USMS cap device is a rendering of the Merchant Marine device in gold- and silver-colored metal. Like the device worn by naval officers, it features a silver eagle, with wings outstretched, above a gold shield; the shield, however, is defaced with an anchor and surrounded by a wreath.

Variants 
A typical peaked cap has a spring stiffening, often in the form of a wire grommet frame, to ensure the sides and rear of the fabric covering have the proper shape. A crusher cap removes the stiffener to allow headphones to be worn over the hat or use in confined spaces such as tanks and submarines, giving it a slouched and worn "crushed" appearance. Such modified caps were especially popular among US Army Air Forces combat pilots and German tank commanders and submariners in the Second World War.

A mariner's cap is another form of headwear similar to a peaked cap.

References

External links 
 

1790s fashion
19th-century fashion
20th-century fashion
21st-century fashion
Caps
Law enforcement uniforms
Military uniforms
Russian clothing
Russian inventions
Maritime culture
Military hats